Dominique Avon is a French historian. He is a scholar of Islam and Christianity and a professor at the Religious Sciences Section of the École pratique des hautes études.

Work
He has written several books on Catholic religious orders such as the Society of Jesus and the Order of Preachers and on Muslim groups such as the Hezbollah (Hezbollah: A History of the "Party of God", written with Anas-Trissa Khatchadourian).

He is also the author of La Fragilité des clercs ("The Frailty of the Intellectuals", untranslated), an essay in which he analyses the thought of Samuel P. Huntington, Tariq Ramadan, Georges Corm, Alain Besançon and Alain Finkielkraut, and criticizes their perceived warmongering tendencies and inability to reason dispassionately about religious matters. The title is a pun on 1927 book La Trahison des clercs by Julien Benda.

Hezbollah: A History of the "Party of God", published by Harvard University Press, contains a historical account as well as important primary sources about Hezbollah. While it was praised by John Quinn from The Risky Shift to be "an exceptional dispassionate analysis of Hezbollah’s early and later years", it has been criticized by Publishers Weekly for relying "too heavily on Hezbollah's rhetoric to explain its motives and actions" and by Princeton scholar Samuel Helfont for using "passive constructions" through which "chronology and causality can be blurry".

References

Year of birth missing (living people)
Living people
French historians of religion
French scholars of Islam
French male non-fiction writers